The Piano Sonata in E-flat minor is a musical work composed by Paul Dukas between 1899 and 1900, and published in 1901.

Structure
 Modérément vif (expressif et marqué) (E-flat minor)
 Calme – un peu lent – très soutenu (A-flat major)
 Vivement – avec légèreté (B minor)
 Très lent (E-flat minor → E-flat major)

Reception
In the first decade of the 20th century, following the immense success of his orchestral work The Sorcerer's Apprentice, Dukas completed two complex and technically demanding large-scale works for solo piano: the Piano Sonata, dedicated to Saint-Saëns, and Variations, Interlude and Finale on a Theme by Rameau (1902). In Dukas's piano works critics have discerned the influence of Beethoven, or, "Beethoven as he was interpreted to the French mind by César Franck". Both works were premiered by Édouard Risler, a celebrated pianist of the era.

In an analysis of the work in The Musical Quarterly in 1928, the critic Irving Schwerké wrote:

The Sonata, described by the critic Edward Lockspeiser as "huge and somewhat recondite", did not enter the mainstream repertoire, but it has more recently been championed by such pianists as John Ogdon, Marc-André Hamelin, and Margaret Fingerhut.

References

Sources

Nicholas, Jeremy (July 2006). "Dukas". Gramophone. p. 74.
Schwerké, Irving (July 1928). "Paul Dukas: a Brief Appreciation". The Musical Quarterly. Volume XIV.

External links

Compositions by Paul Dukas
Dukas
1900 compositions
Compositions in E-flat minor